Trinity High School (THS) is a high school located in Weaverville, California, in Trinity County. The student population is 400, and the grades are 9–12.

Students travel from Coffee Creek, Salyer, Buckhorn Mountain, and Browns Creek to attend THS.

The school colors are Red and White, and the mascot is the Wolf. THS has many extracurricular activities including athletics, academic decathlon, drama, music, and a wide range of clubs.

Classes
The school offers a variety of both standard and AP curriculum based classes.

Athletics
Trinity High School is a part of the Northern Section California Interscholastic Federation.

Sports teams

Notable alumni
 Brian Johnson - musician

External links

References

Public high schools in California
Weaverville, California
Buildings and structures in Trinity County, California
Education in Trinity County, California